Oxyodes tricolor is a species of moth of the family Noctuidae first described by Achille Guenée in 1852. It is found in Australia along the coast of Queensland.

The wingspan is about 40 mm. Adults are a brown with a varied pattern. Usually, there is a white line across each forewing as well as a white spot outlined in black. The hindwings are black and yellow.

The larvae feed on the young leaves of various trees, including Litchi chinensis, Nephelium lappaceum, Cyphomandra betacea and Theobroma cacao. They are black with a black head, orange-yellow prolegs and claspers and a white spot near the tail.

References

Catocalinae